The Presidency of Coromandel and Bengal Settlements was an administrative division of British India, established by the East India Company on 17 July 1682.

History
In 1658 all the settlements in Bengal and on the Coromandel coast were made subordinate to Fort St George.
The presidency of Coromandel and Bengal Settlements, named after the Coromandel Coast and Bengal, was established by the company for the administration of Bengal following the abolition of the Bengal Agency.

Between 1694 and 1698 the administration of the territories of the presidency was subordinated to Madras (Presidency of Fort St. George).	
Then again the authority of the presidency of Coromandel and Bengal Settlements was reestablished until the creation of the Bengal Presidency in 1700.

See also

Fort William
Madras Presidency
Territorial evolution of the British Empire

References

Subdivisions of British India
Historical Indian regions
History of Bengal
Coromandel Coast